Meki Catholic School is a school in Meki, Ethiopia. 

The economical background of the society has kept the school dependent on subsidies from the Catholic Apostolic Vicariate of Meki.

MCS has been run by the Brothers of the Christian Schools, an international congregation of religious men who are qualified educators - called for giving human and Christian education to the poor as a mission, since 1989. The school is divided into two sections: primary and secondary. 

MCS is the only Senior High School in the area. The school has in 2021 2,600 boys and girls from grades 1 through 12 (P2). All four De La Salle Brothers and two Sisters work in the School with lay staff of 67. It has the largest campus of the four schools (St. Joseph Addis, St Joseph Nazareth and Bisrate Gabriel in Dire Dawa) the Brothers run in Ethiopia. 

The school serves more than 200,000 people in the area within a radius of 30 km.

MCS educates the students in metal work, wood work and electrical technology. 30 km away in Ziway there has been a high school since the 1970s. Another high school in Meki was opened in the 1990s. 
 
Brother Betre Fisseha, the longest serving Brother as teacher and headmaster, has served the school for 8 years.

Educational institutions established in 1989
Meki
Education in Oromia Region
1989 establishments in Ethiopia